Rehane Abrahams is a performance artist from Cape Town, South Africa. She has performed several works, from Shakespeare to contemporary productions in South Africa and in America. She was a recipient of the FNB Vita Award for Best Actress in 2001. She is a co-founder of The Mothertongue Project, a collective of women artists. She has written and performed a number of plays that have appeared in South Africa, San Francisco and London.  She has also appeared in numerous television shows, including SOS on e.tv and as Zelda in Hotnotsgode'.

Performances

StageworkShots in the Dark (Abrahams/McCarthy) Marathon, Black Sun Theatre, Johannesburg S.A.Wild South (Wayne Robbins) Topsy, Nico Malan Theatre, Cape Town S.A.Wider Than This (Abrahams) Solo Performance, Cafe Bijou, Johannesburg S.A.Fresh Wounds (Abrahams/Braham) Brenda, Duke of Cambridge Theatre, LondonRites Dance Theatre (workshopped)The Sacrifice, Arena Theatre, Cape Town S.AMacbeth (Shakespeare) Lady Macbeth, Arena Theatre, Cape Town S.A.Adam's Apple (Abrahams) Lillith, Monument Theatre, Grahamstown S.A.The Crucible (Arthur Miller) Abigail Williams, Little Theatre, Cape Town S.A..Venus Goes Vulgar (Abrahams/Hardie) Zerelda, Arena Theatre, Cape Town S.A..The Last Trek (Stopford) Holly, Hiddingh Theatre Cape Town S.A.Dankie Auntie (Zakes Mda) Pearly Heavens, Umanyano Theatre, Grahamstown S.A.House of Bernada Alba (Lorca) Mourner, Arena Theatre, Cape Town S.A.High School Musical - Stage version (Stage manager), Bali, IDA Midsummer Nights Dream - Director, Arma Museum and Resort, Bali, IDConference of the Birds (Youth Ensemble) - Director, Bali Bird Park and Schools Tour, Bali, IDConference of the Birds - Director, Maya Ubud Resort and Spa, Bali, IDTurning the Ear, The Descent of Inanna - Solo Performance, Gaya Fusion Gallery, Bali, IDConference of the Birds - Director, Maya Ubud Resort and Spa, Bali, IDThe Tempest - Director, Site Specific Tour, Bali, IDThe UnFolding - Co-Director, Canggu Club, Bali, IDMacbeth - Director, Greenschool, Bali, IDWomb of Fire (Abrahams) Solo Performance, Baxter Theater, Cape Town S.A.

Film & TelevisionThe Shattered Mirror (drama) Thelma, Ronny Watt Prod. for C.C.V, South Africa.Die Allemans'' (family drama) Dalene, C films for S.A.B.C. South Africa
(an act of...) sabotage, German TV film, 1998, Das kleine Fernsehspiel, ZDF.
Dark Desires: Anna, (TV 1995)

References

Living people
University of Cape Town alumni
South African dramatists and playwrights
People from Cape Town
Year of birth missing (living people)